St Elidan's Church is a Grade II*-listed building in the community of Llanelidan in Denbighshire, Wales.

References

External links
 

Llanelidan
Llanelidan